Sheikh Kabir Hossain is a Bangladeshi businessmen and a member of the Sheikh–Wazed family. He is the President of Bangladesh Insurance Association. He is the President of Association of Private Universities of Bangladesh.

Early life 
Hossain was born on 3 February 1942, in Gopalganj District, East Bengal, British India. His father was Sheikh Mosharraf Hossain and his mother was Rahela Khatun. He completed his Masters from the University of Dhaka. His cousin was Sheikh Mujibur Rahman.

Career 
Hossain worked at the Bangladesh Parjatan Corporation, Bureau of Statistics, and Sonali Bank. He resigned from government job after assassination of Sheikh Mujibur Rahman in 1975.

Hossain is the chairperson of Sonar Bangla Insurance Limited, Khan Shaheb Sheikh Mosharraf Hossain Foundation, Central Depository Bangladesh Limited. He is the founding chairperson of Holy Family Red Crescent Medical College Hospital. He is also the founding chairperson of Khan Shaheb Sheikh Mosharraf Hossain School and College in Tungipara, Gopalganj.   He is the chairperson of National Tea Company Limited. In July 2005, he was elected director of The International Association of Lions Clubs in Hong Kong for a two-year term.

On 16 September 2008, Hossain chaired a meeting of Tungipara Association which demanded that the caretaker government release of former Prime Minister of Bangladesh Sheikh Hasina from prison.

On 15 December 2010, Hossain was elected chairman of Bangladesh Insurance Association. He is a director of Channel 24 and launched its test transmission in August 2011.

Hossain is the President of Bangladesh Insurance Association, a trade association of insurance companies in Bangladesh. He asked Bangladesh Nationalist Party to not hold strikes due to their detrimental effect on the economy. He is the chairperson of Fareast International University and non-profit H.E.L.P. (Health and Education for the Local underprivileged People). He is the Managing Director of Kabico Limited. He is also the Managing Director of Masuda Dairy Nutrition Limited. In 2013, he was part of a panel formed by Dhaka Stock Exchange to investigate problems at the stock market.

Hossain is the Chairperson of Association of Private Universities of Bangladesh, a trade association of private universities in Bangladesh. He was reelected President of the Association in 2017. He is the former chairperson of Bangladesh Red Crescent Society. He is a former Director of the Dhaka Stock Exchange. He is a Trustee Board member of Bangabandhu Academy for Poverty Alleviation and Rural Development.

Hossain was re-elected chairperson of National Tea Company Limited.

In April 2021, Hossain was re-elected President of Bangladesh Insurance Association. He has been serving as president of association since 2011.

Hossain has described the imposition of 15 percent income tax on private universities by the Government of Bangladesh as "unacceptable" in July 2021. He also sought the intervention of Prime Minister Sheikh Hasina to repeal the law. He is a member of the Board of Governors of Bangladesh Open University.

Personal life 
Hossain is married to Masuda Kabir and together they have three children.

References 

Sheikh Mujibur Rahman family
People from Gopalganj District, Bangladesh